Cossato railway station is the train station serving the town and comune of Cossato, in the Piedmont region, northwestern Italy. It is the junction of the Biella–Novara.

The station is currently managed by Rete Ferroviaria Italiana (RFI).  However, the passenger building is managed by comune.  Train services are operated by Trenitalia.  Each of these companies is a subsidiary of Ferrovie dello Stato (FS), Italy's state-owned rail company.

History
The station was opened along with the rest of the line from 18 May 1939, becoming however operation only since 20 July 1940 because of the need to complete several systems and the absence of the rolling stock.

From 21 January 1961, in advance to the end of the concession to the "Società Ferrovia Biella-Novara (SFBN)" company, the management of the railway line passed to the state and the exercise of the stations was assumed by Ferrovie dello Stato.

In the year 2000, the plant management passed to Rete Ferroviaria Italiana, which is classified in the category "Bronze".

Features
Three tracks of which are equipped with platforms.

Train services
The station is served by the following service(s):

Regional services (Treno regionale) Biella San Paolo - Novara

Gallery

See also

 History of rail transport in Italy
 List of railway stations in Piedmont
 Rail transport in Italy
 Railway stations in Italy

References

External links

Cossato
Railway stations in Piedmont
Railway stations opened in 1939